Andrea Jirků (born 14 November 1989) is a Czech long track speed skater who participates in international competitions.

Personal records

Career highlights

European Allround Championships
2007 – Collalbo, 12th
2008 – Kolomna, 22nd
World Junior Allround Championships
2006 – Erfurt, 23rd

External links
Jirků at Jakub Majerski's Speedskating Database
Jirků at SkateResults.com

1989 births
Czech female speed skaters
Place of birth missing (living people)
Living people